Vale FM (formerly 97.4 Gold Radio) was an Independent Local Radio station which broadcast to the Blackmore Vale and Cranborne Chase, from Shaftesbury, Dorset, in southern England.

Background

In the summer of 2008 Chris Carnegy who was the founder and driving force behind the start of the radio station acquired Vale FM from The Local Radio Company. He restructured and rebranded it. During the ownership of TLRC the station moved studios, continuing at the Longmead Industrial Estate in Shaftesbury, overseen by Programme Controller and Station Manager Stewart Smith. Midwest Radio – a project which saw the combining of programmes and resources with Ivel FM in Yeovil, now also identified as Midwest Radio. Carnegy left in March 2009 to join the BBC and the Midwest stations were acquired by Devon businesswoman Michele Roberts.

Cameron Smith continued presenting the weekday morning breakfast show from Shaftesbury through the transition and also recorded a regular weekend 80s show.  In May 2010 the Shaftesbury studios were closed and all programme production moved to Yeovil.  The breakfast show was taken over temporarily by David Mortimer and Cameron's long association with the station ended.

David Mortimer's temporary stewardship of the breakfast show ended on Friday 20 August 2010 and Jason Herbert, previously with Wessex FM, took over as the new breakfast presenter from the following Monday.

It was reported in the Blackmore Vale Magazine that Midwest Radio had been given permission by Ofcom to have a single breakfast show, but John Baker, the station manager, said "the group had no plans to close either of its centres or to stop broadcasting separate breakfast shows for South Somerset and North Dorset.  Although we now have permission from Ofcom to share our breakfast hours, we will not be doing this." Mr Baker implied that broadcasting was continuing from the Shaftesbury studios but this was not the case.

However, by March 2011 the breakfast show had indeed merged, with a single presenter – Steve Carpenter – based in Yeovil and the departure of Jason Herbert. And the fallacy that Mid West was continuing to broadcast from Shaftesbury also had come to an end with the local contact address now being given as "Compton Abbas Airfield, near Salisbury".

The station became part of the UKRD Group In 2020, Vale, along with the other UKRD stations, were sold to Bauer Media and the station was 
rebranded as Greatest Hits Radio Salisbury in September 2020, as part of their national Greatest Hits Radio network. It now broadcasts national and regional music programmes with local news bulletins.

References

External links
OFCOM listing for Vale FM

Radio stations established in 1995
Radio stations in Dorset
Defunct radio stations in the United Kingdom
The Local Radio Company
North Dorset District
Shaftesbury